Betty Rhind (1892–1965) was a New Zealand artist and art teacher.

Biography 
Rhind was born in Wellington. She was an art teacher at Samuel Marsden Collegiate School and taught portraiture to Beverley Shore Bennett. Bennett's portrait of Rhind is included in the collection of the New Zealand Portrait Gallery.

References 

1892 births
1965 deaths
20th-century New Zealand artists
New Zealand art teachers